Polaris Bank Limited is a commercial bank based in Nigeria. It is licensed by the Central Bank of Nigeria, the country's banking regulator. In October 2022, the bank was acquired by Strategic Capital Investment Limited (SCIL).

Overview
Polaris Bank is a large financial services provider in West Africa and Central Africa with headquarters in Nigeria., the bank's total assets were valued in excess of US$3.9 billion (NGN:611.5 billion), with shareholders' equity of approximately US$630 million (NGN:98.4 billion).

History
The bank traces its origins back to 1989 when Prudent Bank Plc., was incorporated as a limited liability company. In 1990, the bank was issued a license as merchant Bank. That same year, it re-branded as Prudent Merchant Bank Limited. In 2006, Prudent Merchant Bank Limited merged with four other Banks to form Skye Bank Plc.:
 Bond Bank Limited
 EIB International Bank Plc.
 Reliance Bank Limited
 Co-operative Bank Plc.

In May 2021, the bank introduced launched VULTe, its Digital Banking platform ." The bank also offers Internet banking and mobile banking. In 2014, the bank acquired Mainstreet Bank Limited.

Ownership

On 21 September 2018, Godwin Emefiele, the governor of the Central Bank of Nigeria announced in Lagos that the apex bank had revoked the operating licence of Skye Bank. He also stated that the assets and liabilities of the bank would be taken over by a new entity, Polaris Bank due to the inability of the Skye Bank's shareholders to adequately recapitalise the bank after the 2016 intervention.

In August 2022, management of Polaris Bank denied reports that the bank was being sold to Auwal Lawan Abdullah, a relative of Ibrahim Babangida.

On 20 October 2022, the Central Bank of Nigeria (CBN) and the Asset Management Corporation of Nigeria (AMCON) announced the sale of 100 per cent of the equity in Polaris Bank to Strategic Capital Investment Limited (SCIL). SCIL paid an upfront consideration of N50billion (approximately US$115 million to acquire 100 per cent of the equity of Polaris Bank. They also agreed to pay N1.305 trillion (approx. US$3 billion) in bonds that CBN and AMCON had injected into Polaris. As a result of this transaction, CBN and AMCON recovered all the capital that had been injected into Polaris since 2018.

Branch network
Polaris Bank Limited maintains an interlinked branch network of over 260 branches in all parts of Nigeria. The bank maintains her headquarters at 3 Akin Adesola Street, Victoria Island, Lagos, Lagos State, Nigeria.

Governance
Effective 2016, the Chairman of the Board is M. K. Ahmad, who chairs the sixteen (16) member Board of Directors. The Chief Executive Officer and Group Managing Director was Innocent Ike, appointed in September 2020.

Following the acquisition by SCIL, the current Chief Executive Officer/Managing Director is Adekunle Sonola.

See also

 Economy of Nigeria
 List of banks in Nigeria
 List of banks in Africa

References

External links
 

Banks of Nigeria
Companies based in Lagos
Companies listed on the Nigerian Stock Exchange
Nigerian brands
2006 establishments in Nigeria
Victoria Island, Lagos